The Jiangpinghe Dam is a concrete face rock-fill embankment dam on the Loushui River near Jiangpinghe village, Zouma Town, in Hefeng County in Hubei Province, China. The purpose of the dam is hydroelectric power generation, flood control and irrigation. The dam houses a hydroelectric power station with 2 x 250 MW generators for a total installed capacity of 500 MW. Its expected generation of 1005 GWh will be transferred to the Central China Power Grid. Construction on the dam began in 2005 and the first generator went online in July 2012.

See also 

 List of power stations in China

References

Hydroelectric power stations in Hubei
Dams in China
Concrete-face rock-fill dams
Dams completed in 2012
2012 establishments in China
Energy infrastructure completed in 2012
Buildings and structures in Hubei